Olaf Karl Tufte (born 27 April 1976 in Tønsberg) is a Norwegian rower, firefighter, and farmer. He is a seven-time Olympian, and as a single sculler he was twice the Olympic champion and twice the world champion. He has been consistently selected to the Norwegian men's senior national rowing squad since 1996, including his selection as a 2020 Tokyo Olympian – where he made his seventh Olympic appearance, racing in the men's quadruple sculls.

Early rowing career 
Tufte started rowing at age 17, initially as a means to improve his handle on motor cross.  He rows from the Horten Roklubb in  Horten, Vestfold on the Oslofjord. He quickly displayed an aptitude for the sport and one year later in 1994, he debuted internationally for Norway rowing a single scull at the 1994 Junior World Rowing Championships. He finished sixth. In 1995 he raced in a Norwegian U23 quad scull which took silver at the Nations Cup in Holland.

Representative rowing career
Tufte's senior debut for Norway came at the Atlanta Olympics in 1996. He rowed in the men's coxless four which finished in overall eighth place. He moved back into sculling boats in 1997 and rowed in the Norwegian quad at the 1997 World Rowing Championships in Aiguebelette for an overall thirteenth finish.  He secured a seat in men's coxless four in 1998 rowing at two World Rowing Cups and then at the 1998 World Rowing Championships where they made the A final and placed sixth.

In 1999 Tufte moved into a double scull with Fredrik Bekken and commenced their 2000 Olympics campaign. They won gold at all three World Rowing Cups in the European international season of 1999 and then took the bronze medal at the 1999 World Championships in St. Catharines, Canada. They preserved their elite ranking all through 2000 and won the silver medal in the men's double scull at the 2000 Sydney Olympics.

Tufte rowed on without a break after Sydney 2000 taking to a single scull. He finished on the podium at all four World Rowing Cups of 2001 and then won his first world championship title with a gold medal row at the 2001 World Rowing Championships in Lucerne. His performance that year saw him named as the 2001 Norwegian Sportsperson of the Year. Tufte then won silver medals at three World Rowing Cups of 2002 and brought home a bronze medal from the 2002 World Rowing Championships in Spain. In 2003 he timed his build-up to win gold and his second world champion title at the World Championships in Milan.

In 2004 Tufte planned his Olympic build-up perfectly. He was fourth at the World Rowing Cup I, second at WRC II, then won gold at WRC III in the June before heading to the 2004 Athens Olympics, where in the men's single scull he beat out the Estonian Jueri Jaanson to win his first Olympic gold medal. He carried on relentlessly into 2005 racing at three World Rowing Cups before finishing in second place at the 2005 World Championships in Gifu, Japan for a silver medal behind New Zealand's Mahe Drysdale who was at that point commencing his own world-class dominant run.

2006 and 2007 saw business as usual for Tufte in his disciplined participation at all the International events but at the  2006 and 2007 World Championships he finished respectively fourth and third with Drysdale now the world champion top man. For the 2008 Summer Olympics in Beijing, Tufte was defending his title as Olympic champion. He won his heat and his quarter-final, finished second in his semi but brought it home in the final beating out Ondrej Synek of the Czech Republic and relegating Drysdale to a bronze position. Tufte was now a dual Olympic champion. Between Athens and Beijing, Tufte's performance had not yielded gold in world championships, but he was viewed as an athlete who rose to the big occasion and he was awarded with the title "number one male rower of 2009" in the 2010 FOCUS issue of FISA's World Rowing Magazine.

Tuft placed fourth at the 2010 World Championships in New Zealand and sixth in 2011 in Slovenia. By the time of the 2012 London Olympics Tuft's star and form was waning. He was unsuccessful in defending his Olympic title missing the A final and finishing with an overall ninth ranking. After the 2012 Olympics, Tufte took a year off to treat and recover from a liver disease which had been affecting his form for some years. He returned to the elite level in the single scull but found himself outside the top placings in the 2014 international season. He lifted in 2015 and at that year's World Championships managed a fourth place behind his old rivals Synek, Drysdale and the Lithuanian Mindaugas Griskonis.

Tufte's career was reborn in 2016 when he paired up with his Horten Roklubb clubmate, the world champion Kjetil Borch in a double scull. They lifted their ranking throughout 2016, qualified for the Rio Olympics at the final European qualification regatta and ultimately won a bronze medal in the men's double sculls in Rio de Janeiro, Brazil. They rowed on together in 2017 and placed fifth at the 2017 World Rowing Championships.

In 2018 Tufte moved back into the quad scull where his career had started. He secured a seat as stroke of the Norwegian quad and they rowed at World Rowing Cups and European Championships through 2018 and 2019. Their seventh-place ranking at the 2019 World Rowing Championships saw them qualify that boat for Tokyo 2020. By the time of the 2021 crew selections for those delayed Olympics, Tufte had held his seat and looked set to make his seventh Olympic rowing appearance.

Personal life 
When not rowing, Tufte earns a living growing cereals at the family farm in the Nykirke part of Horten, and he also works as a fire-fighter.

Footnotes

External links
 Website of Olaf Tufte
 
 
 
 

1976 births
Norwegian male rowers
Rowers at the 1996 Summer Olympics
Rowers at the 2000 Summer Olympics
Rowers at the 2004 Summer Olympics
Rowers at the 2008 Summer Olympics
Rowers at the 2012 Summer Olympics
Rowers at the 2016 Summer Olympics
Rowers at the 2020 Summer Olympics
Olympic rowers of Norway
Medalists at the 2000 Summer Olympics
Medalists at the 2004 Summer Olympics
Medalists at the 2008 Summer Olympics
Medalists at the 2016 Summer Olympics
Olympic gold medalists for Norway
Olympic silver medalists for Norway
Olympic bronze medalists for Norway
Sportspeople from Tønsberg
Olympic medalists in rowing
Living people
World Rowing Championships medalists for Norway
European Rowing Championships medalists